Martons Both is a civil parish in the Craven district of North Yorkshire, England.

The civil parish is formed by the villages of East Marton and West Marton.

According to the 2001 UK census, Martons Both parish had a population of 214, reducing  marginally to 213 at the 2011 Census.

References

Civil parishes in North Yorkshire